Eunicella cavolini, commonly known as the yellow gorgonian or yellow sea whip, is a species of colonial soft coral in the family Gorgoniidae. It is native to parts of the eastern Atlantic Ocean, Mediterranean Sea and Ionian Sea where it is a common species.

Description
It is fan-shaped with the irregular, cylindrical branches largely growing in a single plane. The coenenchyme (the thin fleshy covering of the stiff skeleton) is yellowish-orange. Eunicella cavolini can be confused with the warty gorgonian (Eunicella verrucosa), but that sea fan has rougher branches, or with Leptogorgia sarmentosa, but that species has straighter, more slender branches with smaller polyps.

Distribution and habitat
Eunicella cavolini is common throughout the Mediterranean Sea. It is normally found in a shallower zone than the violescent sea-whip (Paramuricea clavata). It is often found growing in association with other soft corals, sponges, polychaete worms, bryozoans, barnacles and winged oysters.

Biology
The polyps expand their tentacles to catch zooplankton. The food fragments are passed to the mouth and then move into the gut to be digested. The nutrients are then transferred to all parts of the colony via channels in the living matrix of the branches. The fan is usually orientated perpendicular to the current so as to maximise the capture of prey.

Colonies are either male or female and breeding takes place during the summer. Polyps in male colonies liberate sperm into the water and the eggs are fertilised inside the gastric chambers of female polyps in other colonies. The embryos develop into planula larvae which are released into the sea. After drifting as part of the plankton for one to four weeks, these settle on suitable surface and undergo metamorphosis into new polyps. These develop into new colonies by budding.

References

Gorgoniidae
Animals described in 1887